Enqelab Street (also spelled Enghelab) is a major trunk route in Tehran, Iran connecting Enqelab square to Imam Hossein Square.

The street's full name is Enqelab-e Islami  (Islamic Revolution Street) and it was named in honor of the Islamic Revolution of 1979.  Its former name was Shah Reza Street after Rezā Shāh, the founder of the Pahlavi Dynasty.

See also
Girls of Enghelab Street
Toranjestan Soroush

References

External link

Streets in Tehran